Luis Alberto Mosquera Rivera (born 3 October 1959) is a Chilean former footballer. He played for Universidad de Chile, Audax Italiano, C.F. Monterrey, and the Edmonton Brick Men and also represented Chile.

References

External links
 Luis Mosquera at PartidosdeLaRoja.com 

1959 births
Living people
People from Coquimbo
Association football defenders
Chilean footballers
Chilean expatriate footballers
Chile international footballers
Universidad de Chile footballers
Audax Italiano footballers
C.F. Monterrey players
Edmonton Brick Men players
Chilean Primera División players
Liga MX players
Canadian Soccer League (1987–1992) players
Chilean expatriate sportspeople in Mexico
Chilean expatriate sportspeople in Canada
Expatriate footballers in Mexico
Expatriate soccer players in Canada
Olympic footballers of Chile
Footballers at the 1984 Summer Olympics